Jody Eric Reed (born July 26, 1962) is an American former professional baseball second baseman and the third base coach for the Miami Marlins. He played 11 seasons in Major League Baseball (MLB) between 1987 and 1997 for the Boston Red Sox, Los Angeles Dodgers, Milwaukee Brewers, San Diego Padres, and Detroit Tigers.

Career

Amateur
Reed attended Brandon High School in Brandon, Florida, and played college ball at Manatee Community College and Florida State University. He was drafted by the Texas Rangers in the 3rd round of the 1982 MLB Draft (January phase) and 2nd round of the 1983 MLB Draft (June secondary phase) and the San Francisco Giants in the 1st round of the 1982 MLB Draft (June secondary phase) but did not sign.

Boston Red Sox
He was drafted in the 8th round of the 1984 MLB Draft by the Boston Red Sox and signed on June 11, 1984. He played with the Winter Haven Red Sox in the Florida State League in 1984 and 1985, batting .289.

He began 1986 with the New Britain Red Sox of the Eastern League and was promoted mid-season to the Pawtucket Red Sox of the International League.

Reed made his Major League debut for the Red Sox as a pinch runner on September 12, 1987 against the Baltimore Orioles. He made his first start, leading off and playing shortstop against the Orioles on September 18.  He was 3 for 6 with 2 RBI and a stolen base in that game with his first hit being a single off Jeff Ballard in the top of the 5th. He appeared in 9 games that September, with 9 hits in 30 at bats for a .300 average.

In 1988 he became the Red Sox starting shortstop. He hit his first career home run on June 27, 1988 off John Farrell of the Cleveland Indians. He hit .293 that season and finished 3rd in the Rookie of the Year voting.

He switched to second base during the 1989 season and played with the Red Sox through 1992. In 1990 he led the American League with 45 doubles and finished 10th in the AL with 173 hits. He also totaled more than 40 doubles in 1989 and 1991.

In 715 total games with the Red Sox, he hit .280 with 17 homers and 227 RBI. He also hit .250 in the 1988 American League Championship Series and .133 in the 1990 American League Championship Series.

Los Angeles Dodgers
Reed was drafted by the Colorado Rockies as the 13th pick in the 1992 MLB Expansion Draft on November 17, then traded to the Los Angeles Dodgers in exchange for Rudy Seánez.

He played in 132 games for the Dodgers during the 1993 season and hit .276.

Milwaukee Brewers
Reed was offered a three-year $7.8 million contract extension by the Dodgers after the season but turned it down in order to become a free agent. He eventually wound up signing a one-year contract with the Milwaukee Brewers for only $350,000 plus incentives.

He hit .271 with the Brewers in 108 games.

San Diego Padres
Reed signed a free agent contract with the San Diego Padres on April 19, 1995. In two seasons with the Padres he hit .250 in 277 games.

Detroit Tigers
The Padres traded him to the Detroit Tigers on March 22, 1997 in exchange for Mike Darr and Matt Skrmetta.  He only played in 52 games in Detroit, hitting .196.

Coaching
Reed managed the Gulf Coast Yankees from 2007-2008 and was then minor league defensive coordinator for the New York Yankees organization from 2009-2010 and interim manager for the Staten Island Yankees at the start of 2010.

In 2011, he was the manager of the Arizona League Dodgers and the Coordinator of Instruction for the Dodgers Camelback Ranch facility in Glendale, Arizona. He was selected as "Manager of the Year" by the Arizona League in 2011. For 2012 he was named the "Infield Coordinator" for the Dodgers minor league system and he was appointed manager of the Double-A Chattanooga Lookouts for 2013.

See also
 List of Major League Baseball annual doubles leaders

References

External links

MLB historical statistics

Baseball players from Florida
1962 births
Living people
Boston Red Sox players
Florida State Seminoles baseball players
Los Angeles Dodgers players
Milwaukee Brewers players
San Diego Padres players
SCF Manatees baseball players
Detroit Tigers players
Major League Baseball second basemen
Winter Haven Red Sox players
New Britain Red Sox players
Pawtucket Red Sox players
Chattanooga Lookouts managers
State College of Florida, Manatee–Sarasota alumni